Hope Lutheran High School is a private Lutheran high school located in Winona, Minnesota. It was started by a small board in the summer of 2003. The school's mascot is the patriot. The school opened its doors for the fall of 2003-2004 with a class of seven. Now, the school will graduate its first senior class in 2007. The school has grown to over 40 students and plans to expand into a larger building in the near future.

External links
Hope Lutheran High School

The school had its first graduating class in May 2007.

Private high schools in Minnesota
Schools in Winona County, Minnesota
Educational institutions established in 2003
Lutheran schools in Minnesota
Buildings and structures in Winona, Minnesota
2003 establishments in Minnesota
Secondary schools affiliated with the Lutheran Church–Missouri Synod